Fox Harbour may refer to several different things:

Canada

Newfoundland and Labrador
 Fox Harbour, Newfoundland and Labrador
 Fox Harbour (Labrador), Newfoundland and Labrador

Nova Scotia
 Fox Harbour, Nova Scotia
 Fox Harbour Airport